The Western Basin of Lake Erie is the shallow flat basin that comprises the western third of the lake that borders the U.S. states of Michigan and Ohio and the Canadian province of Ontario. The shallowest section of Lake Erie is the western basin where depths average only ; as a result, "the slightest breeze can kick up lively waves," according to a New York Times reporter in 2004. The "waves build very quickly", according to other accounts.
 As of the 2010s much of the phosphorus in the basin comes from fertilizer applied to no-till soybean and corn fields but washed into streams by heavy rains. The algal blooms result from growth of Microcystis, a toxic blue-green algae that the zebra mussels which infest the lake don't eat.

Lighthouses in the Western Basin of Lake Erie
Colchester Reef Light (Lake Erie, West) - Built on Colchester Reef in 1885.
Detroit River Light - Built at the entrance to the Detroit River in 1885.

References

Lake Erie